The Hainan Exhibition & Convention Center was the main convention centre in Haikou City, Hainan Province, China. It is located on Binhai Road adjacent to Evergreen Park. It was completed in 2002.

Closure

In May 2015, the Hainan Exhibition & Convention Center is closed and is being renovated into a mall. It is replaced by the much larger Hainan International Convention And Exhibition Center located on the north coast of the province, roughly 20 km west of downtown Haikou.

References

External links
 Image

Buildings and structures in Hainan
Convention and exhibition centers in China
2015 disestablishments in China
2002 establishments in China